MacLennan v MacLennan 1958 S.C. 105; 1958 S.L.T. 12 (Outer House, Court of Session, Scotland) was a civil law case that required the court to determine if artificial insemination constituted adultery.

Mr and Mrs MacLennan were married in August 1952 but their marriage was not a success.  The couple separate shortly afterwards and Mrs MacLennan went to the U.S.A.  In July 1955, she had a baby girl.  Mr MacLennan sued for divorce citing adultery.  Mrs MacLennan defended this action and claimed that she had conceived the child through artificial insemination not through adultery.  The Court of Session was faced with defining adultery and whether or not artificial insemination could be defined as under this heading.

This is where the definition taken from Lord Wheatley's comments that adultery had to involve "physical contact with an alien and unlawful organ".
The court lays down specific rules for adultery:
1- In adultery there must be two parties, physically present and engaging in sexual act.
2- It is not necessary that there is any interaction between the sperm and the ovum.

The court ruled artificial insemination does not constitute adultery. However, Mrs MacLennan could not provide the court with any proof of her taking artificial insemination. Mr MacLennan therefore got his divorce.

References

1958 in Scotland
Court of Session cases
1958 in case law
Divorce law in the United Kingdom
1958 in British law
Sexual fidelity
Artificial insemination